What Goes Up is a 2009 American comedy-drama film directed by Jonathan Glatzer and starring Hilary Duff, Steve Coogan, Josh Peck, Olivia Thirlby, and Molly Shannon. It was co-written by Glatzer and Robert Lawson and distributed by Sony Pictures Entertainment. Coogan also serves as an executive producer. It premiered on May 8, 2009 at the 3rd Annual Buffalo Niagara Film Festival. What Goes Up was released in the US through Sony Pictures and Three Kings Productions in select theaters on May 29, 2009 and expanded to more theaters the following week. The film grossed $5,290 in its opening weekend.

Plot
Upon arriving in Concord, New Hampshire in January 1986 to cover the hometown hooplah for the looming Space Shuttle Challenger launch, with local teacher Christa McAuliffe on the mission's crew, reporter Campbell Babbitt decides to call an old college friend, only to discover an apparent suicide. Babbitt, who has his own ethical baggage, gravitates toward his friend's high-school students in hopes of finding an unsung hero story about a teacher who made a permanent impact on the social misfits of the school. Instead, he discovers a group of dysfunctional students, outcasts led by narcissistic seductress Lucy, repressed voyeur Jim, and scheming pregnant teen Tess. In a gradual reversal of roles, Babbitt soon finds himself learning from this unusual group of kids.

Cast

Production
The film was originally titled Safety Glass and was first purchased in 1999 by Sunshine Amalgamedia, along with another script by Glatzer. In 2003, Jared Harris and Michelle Williams were cast in undisclosed roles, although neither would end up in the finished product.

Reception
Critical response was generally negative, with Metacritic calculating an average rating of 22% based on 10 reviews. Based on 32 reviews collected by Rotten Tomatoes, it has an average rating of 16% with an average score of 3.3/10. Variety described it as "a pointless and pretentious drama that -- given its title and direct linkage to the 1986 Challenger shuttle disaster—nearly adds tasteless to its unflattering hat trick." The New York Times wrote "There’s some nice filmmaking tucked inside 'What Goes Up,' a muddle of moods and intentions." The Chicago Tribune, The Hollywood Reporter, the Los Angeles Times, and several other publications also panned the film.
Some critics, however, did offer positive reviews. Andrew O'Hehir of Salon.com describes the film as "a nifty little tragicomedy... dark, droll and sentimental in roughly the correct proportions." Noel Murray from The AV Club wrote, "Glatzer and [co-writer] Lawson show a deep understanding of how common ideals can hold even a community of outsiders together." Pete Hammond of Hollywood.com called it "a darkly funny and wonderfully twisted story that marches to its own surprising beat." Former WNBC critic Jeffery Lyons, who called it a "wonderful little film," invited the movie to be screened at the film festival he curates in Breckenridge, Colorado in June, 2009.

DVD
The DVD was released in the US on June 16, 2009. It features a revised cut from the theatrical release, which is ten minutes longer with different music and a reordering of some of the scenes. The film was also released in the Netherlands with an alternative cover of Hilary Duff from a photo shoot in 2005. Also in the opening sequence, the film has the alternate title Safety Glass.

Soundtrack
What Goes Up is the soundtrack for the film What Goes Up, released by independent record label Amherst Records. It was digitally released on iTunes on April 29, 2009 and later on the Nokia Music Store. It was released on May 5, 2009 at Amazon.com's MP3 store. The physical CD was released on July 14, 2009.

Track listing
"Any Other Day" - 3:42 - Hilary Duff 
"Under Wraps" - 3:44 - The Innocent Bystanders 
"A Hero Mix" - 1:20 - Roddy Bottum 
"New World Anthem" - 4:57 - Jeremy Wall 
"The Truth Is" - 3:13 - Anthony Miranda 
"Blue Straggler" - 6:51 - Electrelane 
"Jesus" - 3:25 - Al Sgro & The Brendan Hines 
"Phonebooth Mix" - 3:23 - Roddy Bottum 
"Two for Joy" - 5:50 - Electrelane 
"Lucy on the Roof Mix" - 1:28 - Roddy Bottum 
"Cut and Run" - 3:30 - Electrelane 
"Campbell Walks Mix" - 1:01 - Roddy Bottum 
"You Make Me Week At the Knees" - 3:21 - Electrelane 
"Heroes" - 6:10 - David Bowie 
"Never Comin' Back" - 3:55 - The Innocent Bystanders - (bonus track)
"Teenage Moment" - 3:39 - The Innocent Bystanders - (bonus track)
"Kids (Who Never Grew Up)" - 3:18 - The Innocent Bystanders - (bonus track)

References

External links
 
 
 
 Trailer at Yahoo! movies

2009 films
2000s coming-of-age comedy-drama films
American coming-of-age comedy-drama films
Films set in New Hampshire
Films set in the 1980s
2009 directorial debut films
2000s English-language films
2000s American films